Kök-Oy is a village in Jumgal District of Naryn Region of Kyrgyzstan. Its population was 2,830 in 2021.

References
 

Populated places in Naryn Region